"Cold Reading" is the third and final segment of the eighteenth episode from the first season (1985–86) of the television series The Twilight Zone. In this segment, a careless wish causes the sound effects in a radio drama to manifest inside the studio from which the show is being broadcast.

Plot
In the 1930s, aspiring radio drama actor Milo Trent is invited to serve as a last-minute replacement on the weekly show Dick Noble, African Explorer by the show's creator, Nelson Westbrook. Westbrook has just completed a full rewrite, forcing the cast to read their lines straight from the script without rehearsal. The regular cast also inform Trent that Westbrook never stops a show during recording, no matter what goes wrong. Hoping to impress Westbrook, who is fastidious about authentic production, the effects man shows him a Voodoo artifact he acquired to use for one of the sound effects. Picking it up and examining it, Westbrook declares it a cheap fake and wishes that he could have all the effects in his show come from something real.

As the actors read lines which precede sound effects, an authentic source for that sound effect materializes in the studio. First a vulture manifests to make a caw, then an African tribesman appears to play the drum beats described in the script. Things become more dangerous when a storm brings heavy winds and rain into the studio and a rifle shot is produced by a real rifle. Improvising, the actors declare (still in character) that the storm has broken, and the storm stops. Westbrook remains delighted that the sound effects in his show are now truly authentic, but his co-producer persuades him to at least write out the most dangerous sound effects, such as an elephant stampede and an earthquake. They hastily hand-write the revisions onto copies of the script and have them passed to the actors.

The cast reaches the end of the script and everyone breathes a sigh of relief. However, the show's announcer reads the teaser for next week's episode, "Invaders from Mars". A flying saucer crashes into the sound stage.

External links
 
 Postcards from the Zone episode 1.46 Cold Reading

1986 American television episodes
The Twilight Zone (1985 TV series season 1) episodes
Works about radio
Fiction set in the 1930s

fr:Histoire de monstre